Giles Strangways (1615–1675), was an MP.

Giles Strangways may also refer to:

Giles Strangways (died 1546), MP
Giles Strangways (1528–1562), MP
Giles E. Strangways (1819–1906), pioneer settler of South Australia

See also
Giles Fox-Strangways